Luangahu is an island in Tonga. It is located within the Ha'apai Group in the centre of the country, to northeast of the national capital of Nukualofa. The island is used as a fishing ground by the villagers of Lofanga.

References

Islands of Tonga
Haʻapai